is a Japanese light novel author. In 2005, his debut work Hime no Miko won the Silver Prize at the 12th Dengeki Novel Prize.

Works

 Hime no Miko (Dengeki Bunko, February 2006 ~ )
 Kami-sama no Memo-chō (Dengeki Bunko, 8 Volumes, January 2007 ~ September 10, 2014)
 Sayonara Piano Sonata (Dengeki Bunko, 4 Volumes + 1 Bonus, November 2007 ~ October 2009)
 Shizume no Itaka (Ichijinsha Bunko, May 2008 ~ )
 Sakura Familia! (Ichijinsha Bunko, August 2008 ~ )
 Bakerano! (GA Bunko, September 2008 ~ )
 The Sword Queen and The Branded Child (MF Bunko J, April 2009 ~ )
 Subete no Ai ga Yurusareru Shima (Media Works Bunko, December 2009)
 Shion no Ketsuzoku (Ichijinsha Bunko, March 2010 ~)
 Owaru Sekai no Album (ASCII Media Works, October 2010)
 Hanasakeru Aerial Force (Gagaga Bunko, February 2011)
 Seitokai Tantei Kirika (Kondansha, 4 Volumes, December 2011 ~ )
 Gakusei Shoujo (楽聖少女) (Dengeki Bunko, 3 Volumes, May 2012 ~ November 9th 2013)

References

External links 
 Official Site 
 
 https://twitter.com/hikarus225 

1978 births
21st-century Japanese novelists
Living people
Light novelists